Samba Baldeh (born September 10, 1971) is a Gambian-American immigrant, information technology professional, and Democratic politician. He is a member of the Wisconsin State Assembly, representing the 48th Assembly district since 2021.  He is the first Muslim member of the Wisconsin Legislature. Before his election to the Assembly, he served six years on the Madison Common Council (city council), and was president of the Council from 2018 to 2019.

Early life and career
Samba Baldeh was born in The Gambia, in western Africa. He is a member of the Fulani tribe of semi-nomadic livestock herders. His family's small village, Shoya, lacks official records, but he believes he was born in 1971. His father died when he was about four years old.

There was little formal education in Shoya, which had a population of only about fifty people. The children there were taught Arabic, the Koran, and how to pray. Baldeh later described that curiosity led him to walk the six mile route each day to the "western" school, where he learned to read and speak English. His family soon consented to him moving to the capital, Banjul, at age 8 to live with his uncle and continue his education.

He attended college at the University of the Gambia and became involved in protests against the country's dictator, Yahya Jammeh. His activism brought him to Washington, D.C., in 1999 for a Global Meeting of Generations conference. It was there that he met a student coordinator for Madison Area Technical College. After the conference, he became convinced that he should further his education in science and technology. He emigrated to Madison, Wisconsin, in 2000 and earned his U.S. citizenship in 2005. He studied computer science and earned his associate's degree from Madison Area Technical College in 2007. After receiving his degree, Baldeh started a small IT consulting business and was employed as a software engineer at the Madison-based American Family Insurance.

Political career
In 2015, Baldeh announced he would run for a seat on the Madison Common Council, challenging 8-year incumbent Joe Clausius. Baldeh campaigned on shifting the city's focus from downtown development to increasing services and community space in the city's neighborhoods and strengthening the fabric of the community. In the April 2015 election, Baldeh won a narrow 32 vote victory over Clausius. Baldeh was unopposed seeking reelection in 2017.

In April 2018, the common council unanimously elected Baldeh to serve as president for the 2018–2019 term. Baldeh was outspoken after the wave election of 2019 when nearly half of the common council members and the longtime Mayor of Madison, Paul Soglin, were ousted. He pointed out that such a massive change in personnel might be disruptive until the new members got up to speed, and wanted to refocus attention on one of the major campaign issues, the contentious development of the Judge Doyle Square project.

In January 2020, northern Madison's assembly representative, Melissa Sargent, announced she would forego reelection and would instead run for a newly open seat in the Wisconsin State Senate. Baldeh was one of four Democrats who entered the primary to replace her in the Wisconsin State Assembly. Baldeh ultimately prevailed in the primary with nearly 50% of the vote. He faced 19-year-old Republican Samuel Anderson in the general election, and won nearly 80% of the vote in the heavily Democratic district.

Personal life and family
Samba Baldeh was born into the Fulani tribe of semi-nomadic livestock herders. His mother still lives in The Gambia. Aside from his work and political career, Baldeh has been active with the Kanifing-Madison sister city project, the AIDS Network, the Senegambia Association, and the Big Brothers Big Sisters of Madison. He has also been a member of the boards of the Young African Leaders Initiative and the 100 Black Men of Madison.

In 2016, he was a guest of Wisconsin congressman Mark Pocan to President Barack Obama's 2016 State of the Union Address.

He and his wife, Fatou, were married in 2008. They live on Madison's north side.

Electoral history

Madison City Council (2015, 2019)

| colspan="6" style="text-align:center;background-color: #e9e9e9;"| General Election, April 7, 2015

| colspan="6" style="text-align:center;background-color: #e9e9e9;"| General Election, April 2, 2019

Wisconsin Assembly (2020)

| colspan="6" style="text-align:center;background-color: #e9e9e9;"| Democratic Primary, August 11, 2020

| colspan="6" style="text-align:center;background-color: #e9e9e9;"| General Election, November 3, 2020

References

External links
 
 
 2020 Campaign website
 2015 Campaign website (Archived - April 15, 2015)
 48th Assembly District map (2011–2021)

Living people
1971 births
Wisconsin city council members
21st-century American politicians
Madison Area Technical College alumni
African-American state legislators in Wisconsin
African-American Muslims
Gambian emigrants to the United States
Gambian Muslims
21st-century African-American politicians
20th-century African-American people
Democratic Party members of the Wisconsin State Assembly